South Pacific Trail is a 1952 American Western film directed by William Witney, written by Arthur E. Orloff, and starring Rex Allen, Estelita Rodriguez, Slim Pickens, Nestor Paiva, Roy Barcroft and Douglas Evans. It was released on October 20, 1952, by Republic Pictures.

Plot

Cast
Rex Allen as Rex Allen
Koko as Rex's Horse
Estelita Rodriguez as Lita Alvarez 
Slim Pickens as Slim Pickens
Nestor Paiva as Carlos Alvarez
Roy Barcroft as Link Felton
Douglas Evans as Rodney Brewster
Joe McGuinn as Henchman Ace
Forrest Taylor as Train Conductor
The Republic Rhythm Riders as Cowhands

References

External links 
 

1952 films
1952 Western (genre) films
American heist films
American Western (genre) films
Films directed by William Witney
Rail transport films
Republic Pictures films
1950s heist films
American black-and-white films
1950s English-language films
1950s American films